Ingvar Gunnar Oldsberg (31 March 194510 February 2022) was a Swedish television presenter and sports journalist.

Early life
Oldsberg was born on 31 March 1945 in Annedal Parish, Gothenburg. Oldsberg grew up in Mölnlycke outside Gothenburg. On his mother's side, he had Norwegian roots. He passed studentexamen in 1965 and then did military basic training in Älvsborg Regiment (I 15) in Borås as a medic.

Career
He is best known for hosting På spåret between 1987 and 2009. In April 2014, Oldsberg was revealed as the new host of Bingolotto at Sjuan replacing Marie Serneholt.

Personal life
Oldsberg lived in an apartment in Gothenburg. He also owned a house on Orust and an apartment in Costa del Sol, Spain. He has also owned the Baldersnäs manor in Dalsland. He has been married to Laila Oldsberg and Monica Oldsberg and cohabits with Gunilla Knutsson and Pauline Wood. From 2016 until her death, Oldsberg was engaged to hotel director Maria Sandeblad. He had three children; Staffan Oldsberg (born 1968), Karolina Oldsberg (born 1975) with Laila and Viktoria Oldsberg (born 1989) with Gunilla.

Death
Oldsberg died of a heart attack on 10 February 2022, at the age of 76.

References

External links

 
 
 

1945 births
2022 deaths
20th-century Swedish journalists
21st-century Swedish journalists
Swedish television hosts
People from Gothenburg